is a 1970 Japanese film directed by Hiromichi Horikawa.

Release
The Militarists had a roadshow release in Japan on 11 August 1970 where it was distributed by Toho. It received general release 12 September 1970 in Japan. The film was Toho's highest grossing release of the year and the second highest grossing Japanese film production in 1970.

The film was released in the United States  as Gunbatsu (The Militarists) with English subtitles by Toho International. It was released 10 March 1971.

Cast
 Keijyu Kobayashi as Hideki Tōjō
 Yūzō Kayama as Gorō Arai
 Tatsuya Mihashi as Takijirō Ōnishi
 Seiji Miyaguchi as Shigenori Tōgō
 Akira Kubo as Takami
 Ichirō Nakatani as Sano
 Yoshio Tsuchiya as Okabe
 Gorō Mutsumi as Ishida
 Akihiko Hirata as Tomita
 Ryūji Kita as Koshirō Oikawa
 Sachio Sakai as Kitamura
 Kazuo Kitamura as Yamanaka
 Takashi Shimura as Takeda
 Jūkei Fujioka as Nakata
 Shin Kishida as Takakura
 Toshio Kurosawa as Shimagaki
 Masao Shimizu as Saburō Kurusu
 Susumu Fujita as Osami Nagano
 Sō Yamamura (special appearance) as Mitsumasa Yonai
 Toshirō Mifune as Isoroku Yamamoto

See also
 List of Japanese films of 1970

References

Footnotes

Sources

External links
 

Toho films
1970s Japanese films